George Seagar was a New Zealand professional rugby league footballer who represented New Zealand. His younger brother Allan Seagar also represented New Zealand at rugby league.

Rugby League Playing career and Rowing
George Seagar was a boiler maker by trade, living in Devonport on Auckland's North Shore. Seagar was one of the first rugby league footballers in New Zealand, representing Auckland against Taranaki in 1909.

In 1909 he joined the North Shore Albions club as a founding player and also served on the Auckland Rugby League's management committee. Seagar played for both Auckland and New Zealand against the touring Great Britain Lions.

He again represented New Zealand in 1911, being part of the tour of Australia, although no test matches were played on tour.

By 1912 Seagar was the captain of North Shore Albions and he again represented Auckland. He did return to Auckland after the war and resumed his career with North Shore playing for them until 1920.

Seagar was also a well known member of the North Shore Rowing club.

His brother Allan Wilfred Seagar would also play for North Shore in the 1920s and 30s and he represented New Zealand in 1930.

World War I
Like many other players of the time his sporting career was either cut short or punctuated by the war. He enlisted in the army and embarked on the Waimana on October 16, 1914 to join the war effort as a corporal, landing at Suez, Egypt. He was part of the Divisional Train, A.S.C., Main Body. He was promoted to sergeant and returned to New Zealand onboard the steamer Willochra early in 1916 after being admitted to hospital on August 8, 1915 suffering from dysentery. Seagar was discharged from service on April 12, 1916 and later awarded the British War Medal and the Victory Medal.

References

1888 births
1968 deaths
Auckland rugby league team players
British Army personnel of World War I
New Zealand national rugby league team players
New Zealand rugby league administrators
New Zealand rugby league players
North Shore Albions players
Place of birth missing
Rugby league fullbacks
Rugby league locks